Cole R. Irvin (born January 31, 1994) is an American professional baseball pitcher for the Baltimore Orioles of Major League Baseball (MLB). Irvin was drafted by the Philadelphia Phillies in the fifth round of the 2016 MLB draft, and made his MLB debut with them in 2019. He pitched for the Oakland Athletics from 2021 to 2022.

Early life and amateur career
Irvin is from Yorba Linda, California. He graduated from Servite High School in Anaheim, California. As a junior, he posted a 1.40 ERA. After graduating, he was drafted in the 29th round of the 2012 Major League Baseball draft by the Toronto Blue Jays, but he did not sign. That summer, Irvin played for the Cowlitz Black Bears of the West Coast League, pitching to 5-1 record with a 2.56 ERA.

After not signing with Toronto, Irvin enrolled at the University of Oregon where he played college baseball for the Oregon Ducks. In 2013, as a freshman, he went 12–3 with a 2.48 ERA in 116 innings (second most in school history) while striking out sixty batters, and was named a freshman All-American by Louisville Slugger, Baseball America, Perfect Game, and the NCBWA, along with earning Pac-12 honorable mention. Prior to the 2014 season, Irvin underwent Tommy John surgery and was forced to miss the year. He returned to pitching in 2015, going 2–5 with a 4.10 ERA over 79 innings. In 2016, as a redshirt junior, he was named to the Pac-12 Conference First Team after compiling a 6–4 record with a 3.17 ERA while striking out 93 and walking only 16 over 105 innings.

Professional career

Philadelphia Phillies
Irvin was drafted by the Philadelphia Phillies in the fifth round (137th overall) of the 2016 Major League Baseball draft, signing for $800,000. After signing, he was assigned to the Williamsport Crosscutters and he spent the whole season there, going 5–1 with a 1.97 ERA in ten games (seven starts). In 2017, he pitched for both the Clearwater Threshers and Reading Fightin Phils, compiling a 9–9 record and 3.39 ERA over 26 games (25 starts) between both teams. With Clearwater, he was named a Florida State League All-Star.

In 2018, Irvin played for the Lehigh Valley IronPigs, pitching to a 14–4 record (leading the International League (IL) in wins, and setting a franchise record), leading all Class AAA pitchers in both ERA (2.57) and WHIP (1.054) over 26 games (25 starts). He was named the International League's Most Valuable Pitcher, as well as a mid-season All-Star (starting the All-Star Game) along with being named Pitcher of the Week twice throughout the season.

In 2019 with Lehigh Valley, Irvin was 6-1 with a 3.94 ERA, appearing in 17 games (16 starts), while pitching 93 innings, and yielding 14 walks. His 1.3 walks/9 innings ratio tied for the second-best in the International League.

Irvin was promoted to the major leagues for the first time on May 12, 2019, and made his big league debut that day. He pitched seven innings, giving up one earned run, and earning his first MLB win. Irvin’s 2019 Phillies stat line included a 2-1 record with one save and a 5.83 ERA while appearing in 16 games (three starts), and pitching 41 innings. In 2020, Irvin only pitched in three games, notching a 17.18 ERA with four strikeouts over 3 innings pitched.

Oakland Athletics
On January 30, 2021, the Phillies traded Irvin to the Oakland Athletics in exchange for cash considerations. In 2021, Irvin posted a 10–15 record with a 4.24 ERA in  innings over 32 starts. He led the American League in losses (15) and hits allowed (195).

Baltimore Orioles
The Athletics traded Irvin to the Baltimore Orioles with right-handed pitcher Kyle Virbitsky for infielder Darell Hernáiz on January 26, 2023.

Personal
Irvin completed his undergraduate degree in sociology in three and a half years. He is the owner of Swirvin Limited which began as a maker of custom fishing rods but has branched out into apparel and other merchandise carrying the company's logo.

References

External links

Living people
1994 births
People from Yorba Linda, California
Baseball players from California
Major League Baseball pitchers
Philadelphia Phillies players
Oakland Athletics players
Oregon Ducks baseball players
Williamsport Crosscutters players
Clearwater Threshers players
Reading Fightin Phils players
Lehigh Valley IronPigs players
Servite High School alumni